Uggerslev is a village in Nordfyn municipality on the island of Funen, Denmark, with a population of 360 (1 January 2022).

External links
Nordfyn municipality

References

Cities and towns in the Region of Southern Denmark
Nordfyn Municipality